In enzymology, a 1,2-alpha-L-fucosidase is an enzyme that catalyzes the chemical reaction

methyl-2-alpha-L-fucopyranosyl-beta-D-galactoside + HO  L-fucose + methyl beta-D-galactoside

Thus, the two substrates of this enzyme are methyl-2-alpha-L-fucopyranosyl-beta-D-galactoside and HO, whereas its two products are L-fucose and methyl beta-D-galactoside.

This enzyme belongs to the family of hydrolases, specifically those glycosidases that hydrolyse O- and S-glycosyl compounds.  The systematic name of this enzyme class is 2-alpha-L-fucopyranosyl-beta-D-galactoside fucohydrolase. Other names in common use include almond emulsin fucosidase, and alpha-(1->2)-L-fucosidase.

Structural studies

References

 
 
 

EC 3.2.1
Enzymes of known structure